Pterygiella is a genus of flowering plants belonging to the family Orobanchaceae.

Its native range is Tibet to Southern Central China.

Species:

Pterygiella bartschioides 
Pterygiella cylindrica 
Pterygiella duclouxii 
Pterygiella luzhijiangensis 
Pterygiella muliensis 
Pterygiella nigrescens 
Pterygiella parishii 
Pterygiella suffruticosa 
Pterygiella tenuisecta 
Pterygiella trichosepala

References

Orobanchaceae
Orobanchaceae genera